Navalnyy v Russia [2018] ECHR 1062 is a human rights law case, concerning freedom of association, liberty and the right to a fair trial. It centered around Alexei Navalny, a Russian opposition activist.

Facts
Alexei Navalny, an activist against corruption and a blogger, was arrested seven times between 2012 and 2014 for a rally, three ‘walkabout’ gatherings, two demonstrations, and a courthouse gathering, and held liable for administrative offences, or disobeying police orders. The Code of Administrative Offences art 20(2) made it an offence to breach procedures for conduct of public gatherings. He was fined and got short custodial sentences. He argued this breached the European Convention on Human Rights articles 5, 6, 11 and 18. He argued the Russian authorities had an ulterior purpose of stopping his political engagement and influence.

Judgment
The European Court of Human Rights held there were breaches of articles 5, 6 and 11. The Russian courts acted unfairly by basing their judgments only on police accounts, and in all seven cases there was a breach of the right to assembly. Article 18 was breached because there was a pattern of arrest, on progressively more implausible grounds. Response was increasingly severe. It was aimed to suppress political pluralism, which formed part of ‘effective political democracy’ governed by ‘the rule of law’.

See also

International human rights law
UK constitutional law

References

External links
 Full text of the judgment

United Kingdom constitutional case law
European Court of Human Rights cases involving Russia
Alexei Navalny
2011–2013 Russian protests
Article 5 of the European Convention on Human Rights
Article 6 of the European Convention on Human Rights
Article 11 of the European Convention on Human Rights